Ziadi is a surname. Notable people with the surname include:

Fateh Ziadi (born 1976), Algerian sport shooter
Mehdi Ziadi (born 1969), Moroccan tennis player
Rekia Ziadi (born 1986), Algerian handball player
Zied Ziadi (born 1990), Tunisian footballer